Rose of Jericho or Jericho rose may refer to:

Plant common names 
 Rose of Sharon
 Anastatica, a monotypic genus with the type species Anastatica hierochuntica
 Selaginella lepidophylla, a species of desert plant in the spikemoss family (Selaginellaceae)
 Pallenis hierochuntica, a species of Pallenis that is notable for being a resurrection plant

Other uses 
 "The Rose of Jericho", a song by trance music DJ BT
 "Rose of Jericho," a song by Eddie Vedder from his 2022 album Earthling.
 Rose of Jericho, a song by Eleventh Dream Day
 Rose of Jericho, a short story collection by Ivan Bunin
 Rose of Jericho, dam of the racehorse Dr Devious
 Vered Yeriho (Hebrew for Rose of Jericho), a settlement in the West Bank of Israel